This article covers the results and statistics of FC Thun during the 2012–13 season. During the season Thun will compete in the Swiss Super League and in the Swiss Cup.

Match results

Legend

Swiss Super League

League results and fixtures

League table

Swiss Cup

External links
 FC Thun official website
 FC Thun on soccerway.com

Thun season
FC Thun seasons